Iván Miranda Chang (born March 8, 1980) is a professional tennis player from Peru.  He achieved a career-high singles ranking of World No. 104 in 2003.

Miranda has participated in 26 Davis Cup events for Peru from 1998 to the present day, posting a 15–18 record in singles and an 8–11 record in doubles.

Singles titles (3)

Runners-up (3)

External links
 
 
 

1980 births
Living people
Sportspeople from Lima
Peruvian people of Chinese descent
Peruvian male tennis players
Tennis players at the 2007 Pan American Games
Pan American Games competitors for Peru
Tennis players at the 2011 Pan American Games
South American Games medalists in tennis
South American Games bronze medalists for Peru
Competitors at the 1998 South American Games
21st-century Peruvian people